Statistics of Czechoslovak First League in the 1931–32 season. Raymond Braine was the league's top scorer with 16 goals.

Overview
It was contested by 9 teams, and Sparta Prague won the championship.

League standings

Results

Top goalscorers

References

Czechoslovakia - List of final tables (RSSSF)

Czechoslovak First League seasons
1931–32 in Czechoslovak football
Czech